The 2011–12 Michigan Wolverines men's basketball team represented the University of Michigan during the 2011–12 NCAA Division I men's basketball season. The team played its home games in Ann Arbor, Michigan at Crisler Center for the 45th consecutive year. It had a seating capacity of 12,721. It was also the team's 95th straight season as a member of the Big Ten Conference. Fifth-year head coach John Beilein led the team, alongside All-Big Ten players Trey Burke, Tim Hardaway Jr. and Zack Novak. Burke was named Big Ten Freshman of the Year and was Michigan's first Associated Press All-American honoree since 1998.

The team's season began with a preseason media day and practices in October 2011. In February 2012, Michigan hosted ESPN's College GameDay for the first time in a game against Ohio State. It was the eighth time a Big Ten team hosted the show, which began in 2005.

The team was in the national rankings all season and ended as the 2011–12 Big Ten co-champion with Michigan State and Ohio State. It had three victories over teams ranked in the top 10 at the time of the meeting (eighth-ranked Memphis, ninth-ranked Michigan State and sixth-ranked Ohio State). The team was undefeated at home until its last home game of the season. Michigan lost in the semifinals of the 2012 Big Ten Conference tournament and bowed out in the second round of the 2012 NCAA tournament to end the season with a 24–10 record. The team won the school's first Big Ten Conference Championship since the 1985–86 season and had the school's best Big Ten record (13–5) since the 1993–94 season.

Preseason

2011–12 incoming team members
Before the season began, point guard Darius Morris, the Big Ten assists leader in the 2010–11 season, left the team after being drafted by the Los Angeles Lakers. The incoming class included Carlton Brundidge and 2011 Ohio Mr. Basketball point guard Trey Burke. Both Brundidge and Burke were among Scout.com's top 100 players of the 2011 class; Brundidge ranked 98th and Burke ranked 94th. Max Bielfeldt committed to Michigan in April despite his family's ties to the Illinois Fighting Illini. Illinois University's Bielfeldt Athletic Administration Building was endowed by his family. Sai Tummala, who along with Bielfeldt was recruited by Ivy League schools, rounded out the incoming class. Tummala earned an academic scholarship and was considered a walk-on candidate for the basketball team.

Tim Hardaway Jr., son of former NBA All-Star Tim Hardaway, returned to the team. He was coming off a freshman season in which he was a unanimous Big Ten All-Freshman, All-Big Ten honorable mention, Collegeinsider.com Freshmen All-America and Team USA FIBA U19 honoree. Jordan Dumars, the son of Detroit Pistons All-Star Joe Dumars, left the team, citing nagging knee issues.

2011–12 team recruits

Roster

Former team captains Travis Conlan (1996–97 and 1997–98) and C.J. Lee (2008–09) served as director of basketball operations and administrative specialist, respectively. Peter Kahler was the team's video coordinator.

Schedule
Michigan announced its 14-game non-conference schedule on August 1, 2011. The team began the season in a renovated Crisler Arena: new seats and a high-definition scoreboard were added, but seating capacity was reduced to 12,721 from 13,751 in the previous 10 seasons.

Michigan came in third place in the three-game 2011 Maui Invitational Tournament between November 21–23. The team defeated the eighth-ranked Memphis Tigers 73–61, lost to the sixth-ranked Duke Blue Devils 82–75, and defeated the Pac-12 favorite UCLA Bruins 79–63. Tim Hardaway Jr. was named the Big Ten Player of the Week, and Trey Burke was named Big Ten Freshman of the Week. In an ACC–Big Ten Challenge game in late November, Michigan lost to Virginia 70–58. In its next game, Michigan defeated Iowa State 76–66. On December 10, 2011, Michigan beat Oakland 90–80, its highest-scoring game since beating  97–50 on November 14, 2009. It was also Michigan's first game since 2002 with three 20-point scorers (Hardaway, Burke and Evan Smotrycz). Burke earned his second Freshman of the Week honor on December 12 after scoring a season-high 20 points and nine assists in the game. On the same day, Michigan was the highest-rated Big Ten team in the Ratings Percentage Index, although the team trailed several schools in the national polls.

Heading into the Big Ten Conference schedule, both of the teams Michigan had lost to were ranked (Duke was 7th and 5th in the AP and Coaches' polls and Virginia was 23rd and 24th). On December 29, Michigan won its first Big Ten Conference opener since 2006–07, beating Penn State as Smotrycz extended his double-double streak to three games. On January 2, Burke earned his first Big Ten Conference Player of the Week honor and his third Freshman of the Week honor for his 40 points in Michigan's first two conference games. On December 29 against Penn State he posted 13 points, seven assists, five rebounds and no turnovers. On January 1, 2012, he added a career-high 27 points on 8-for-11 shooting with three rebounds and three assists against Minnesota to earn Big Ten Conference Player of the Week the following day.

On January 19, Michigan became the leader in the conference with a 5–2 record, thanks to conference wins over ranked Wisconsin and Michigan State teams. Michigan remained in first place until losing to Ohio State ten days later. The team went 5–2 in conference in February, including wins over ranked Indiana and Ohio State teams. Michigan lost its final home game of the season to Purdue on February 25 to finish with a 15–1 home record. On March 1, the team defeated Illinois for their first road win in Illinois since 1995. During the game, Michigan's 30th of the season, Trey Burke broke Gary Grant's school freshman assists record, set over the course of 30 games in the 1984–85 season, by pushing his total to 143. The March 4 victory over Penn State clinched a share of the 2011–12 Big Ten Conference season regular season championship.

In the first game of the 2012 Big Ten Conference men's basketball tournament against Minnesota, Burke led the team to victory with a career-high 30 points. Burke's total was a school record for the Big Ten Conference men's basketball tournament. In the semifinal contest, however, Michigan was eliminated by Ohio State for the third year in a row. Michigan entered the 2012 NCAA Division I men's basketball tournament seeded fourth, but lost to the thirteenth-seeded Ohio Bobcats 65–60. Burke became Michigan's first Associated Press All-American honoree since Robert Traylor and Louis Bullock in 1998.

Stu Douglass concluded the season as the school's all-time leader in games played, with 136. He surpassed Loy Vaught, who played in 135 games. Novak set the school record in career minutes played with 4,357, surpassing Louis Bullock, who played 4,356 minutes. Burke had a school record-setting freshman season in assists, ending the year with 156.

Results

|-
!colspan=12 style="background:#242961; color:#F7BE05;"| Exhibition

|-
!colspan=12 style="background:#242961; color:#F7BE05;"| Non-conference Regular Season

|-
!colspan=12 style="background:#242961;"| Big Ten Regular Season

|-
!colspan=12 style="background:#242961;"| Big Ten tournament	

|-
!colspan=12 style="background:#242961;"| NCAA tournament

Statistics

The team posted the following statistics:

Rankings

Watchlists and awards

Preseason

Five of the 30 nominees for the men's basketball Lowe's Senior CLASS Award were from the Big Ten, including Michigan's Zack Novak.

In-season

Trey Burke was one of nearly 60 Bob Cousy Award candidates named in December 2011. On January 4, Burke was one of 20 finalists. On January 25, Novak was named one of ten finalists for the Lowe's Senior CLASS Award along with three other Big Ten athletes. He was also one of four Big Ten men's basketball players named Academic All-District, putting him among the 40 finalists for the 15-man Academic All-America team. Novak was named a third team Academic All-American.

Accolades and honors

Trey Burke
CBSSports.com Second Team All-American
Big Ten Freshman of the Year (Big Ten media)
Co-Big Ten Freshman of the Year (Sporting News)
All-Big Ten (second team, coaches and media)
All-Freshman (unanimous)
USBWA All-District V Team

Tim Hardaway
All-Big Ten (third team, coaches and media)

Zack Novak
Academic All-District
Academic All-American (third team)
All-Big Ten (honorable mention, media)
Academic All-Big Ten

Josh Bartelstein
Academic All-Big Ten

Matt Vogrich
Academic All-Big Ten

Roster changes
The team lost senior captains Stu Douglass and Zack Novak as well as senior reserve Corey Person to graduation following the season. Person was later granted an extra year of eligibility to return to the team.  At the end of the season, three players (Evan Smotrycz, Carlton Brundidge and Colton Christian) decided to leave the program. Smotrycz, who had started in 42 of the 69 games he played in during his first two years, left the program as the program's fifth all-time three-point shooter with a percentage of 40.5. Smotrycz transferred to Maryland, Brundidge transferred to Detroit and Christian transferred to Florida International.

Following the season, Trey Burke first said he was not inclined to enter the 2012 NBA draft. A few days later, however, the realization that the pool of point guards in the 2012 draft was shallow and Burke's stock was high led to some deliberation for him and his family: "When you have a season as a freshman like he did, the NBA, they like them young," Trey's father, Benji Burke said. "They think their ceiling is higher when they're young. Trey had ... a solid season for a freshman. It's going to be one of the weaker point guard drafts in years." Some observers thought Burke was at his peak in terms of NBA potential. Eventually, he decided to return to play for Michigan for another year.

2012–13 team recruits
The team announced in September 2010 that Glenn Robinson III, son of former first overall NBA draft pick Glenn Robinson, verbally agreed to attend Michigan, making him the first commitment in the school's class of 2012. Canadian wing guard Nik Stauskas gave Michigan its second verbal commitment for the class of 2012 on March 26, 2011. On November 3, Mitch McGary, who was ranked as the number-two prospect in the nation at the time, announced his verbal commitment to Michigan.  Within hours of the commitment, ESPN said that Michigan's ranked as the fifth-best class in the nation. All three signed a National Letter of Intent with the team on November 9. After several other schools announced their commitments, the McGary's commitment moved Michigan from outside the top 25 to the seventh-best class in the nation, according to ESPN. Michael "Spike" Albrecht committed to Michigan on April 6, 2012.

Team Players Drafted into the NBA

Notes

External links
M Go Blue basketball page
2011–12 schedule @ ESPN
2011–12 stats @ ESPN

Michigan Wolverines
Michigan Wolverines men's basketball seasons
Michigan
Michigan
Michigan